Filomena Valenzuela Goyenechea (1848–1924) was a Chilean soldier, known as La Madrecita. Originally a cantinière, she came to participate directly in combat in the Battle of Pisagua, Battle of Dolores and Battle of Los Ángeles during the War of the Pacific.

References 

1848 births
1924 deaths
19th-century Chilean people
Women in 19th-century warfare
Women in war in South America